Nea Propontida ("New Propontis") is a municipality in the Chalkidiki regional unit, Central Macedonia, Greece. The seat of the municipality is the town Nea Moudania. The municipality has an area of 372.317 km2.

Municipality 
The municipality Nea Propontida was formed at the 2011 local government reform by the merger of the following 3 former municipalities, that became municipal units:
Kallikrateia
Moudania
Triglia

References

Municipalities of Central Macedonia
Populated places in Chalkidiki